WXQW (660 AM) is a talk radio station licensed to Fairhope, Alabama, and serving the Mobile metropolitan area. The station is owned by Cumulus Media and the broadcast license is held by Cumulus Licensing LLC.  The radio studios and offices are on Dauphin Street in Midtown Mobile.

By day, WXQW broadcasts at 10,000 watts non-directional, covering parts of Alabama, Mississippi and the Florida Panhandle.  But at night, it reduces power to 19 watts to avoid interfering with other stations on 660 kHz, a clear-channel frequency.  WXQW's transmitter is on Pollard Road at Newman Road in Daphne, Alabama.

Programming
WXQW airs mostly nationally syndicated conservative talk shows from Westwood One, a subsidiary of Cumulus Media.  They include Dan Bongino, Chris Plante, Ben Shapiro, Mark Levin, Michael J. Knowles and "Red Eye Radio."  Mornings begin with two Westwood One news shows, "America in The Morning" and "First Light."  From Fox News Talk, Brian Kilmeade is heard in middays.  National news is heard at the beginning of each hour from CBS Radio News.

The station began as a country & western outlet in 1964, later broadcasting contemporary Christian music, children's radio, urban contemporary gospel, all-news radio from CNN Headline News, blues music, and syndicated talk formats in its nearly 50 years on the air.

History

Launch
In the early 1960s, Springhill Broadcasting, Inc., applied to the Federal Communications Commission (FCC) for a new AM radio station in Mobile which would be powered at 50,000 watts.  It would broadcast on 1550 kHz as a daylight-only station, required to go off the air at sunset. The FCC granted the company a construction permit to build this new station and assigned call letters "WMOE" while construction was under way. Springhill Broadcasting was initially led by Marvin Burton as president and Samuel R. David as both vice president and general manager.

Assigned new call sign "WMOO", the station began licensed broadcast operations in 1964 with a country & western music format. By 1969, Samuel R. David would take over as president of license holder Springhill Broadcasting. Under his leadership, Springhill Broadcasting reached a deal to sell WMOO to Trio Broadcasters, Inc. (George Beasley, president) which was consummated on December 17, 1969. The new owners flipped the format from country to contemporary Christian music and maintained it through the 1970s and into the 1980s.

Move to 660 kHz

In March 1981, Trio Broadcasters, Inc., applied to the FCC to make extensive changes to their broadcast license for WMOO. The company applied to change the community of license from Mobile to Fairhope, Alabama, to convert from daytimer status to a 24-hour operation with reduced daytime power plus nighttime service at 1,000 watts, to change broadcast frequency from 1550 kHz to 660 kHz, and to move the reconfigured antenna system to a new location just outside Daphne, Alabama. The FCC accepted the filing on May 15, 1981, and finally granted a construction permit for these changes on September 26, 1984.  This permit was scheduled to expire one year later, on September 2, 1985. After a long series of modifications and extensions, the station completed construction and applied for a license to cover these changes in August 1988. The FCC granted this request and the station began licensed operation on the new frequency from the new location with the new operating hours and power levels on November 10, 1988. As part of these changes, the station requested a new call sign from the FCC and was assigned "WLIT" on January 24, 1988. That change proved short-lived as the station became "WBLX" on July 4, 1988.

The new WBLX was sold shortly after it was completed. Trio Broadcasters, Inc., reached a deal to sell the station to Central Life Broadcasting of Alabama, Inc., in September 1988. The FCC approved the sale on November 2, 1988, and the transaction was formally consummated on May 11, 1989.

1990s
Less than a year later, in April 1990, a deal was reached to sell WBLX to April Broadcasting, Inc.  The FCC approved the sale on July 23, 1990, and the transaction was formally consummated on October 31, 1990.

On October 4, 1996, the station's call sign was changed to "WHOZ" when the station flipped to children's radio as an affiliate of Radio AAHS. The new format made its formal debut with a promotion at Bayfest on October 5, 1996. WHOZ became the first radio station in the Mobile metropolitan area to air a radio format designed for children.   Unable to compete with Radio Disney, the entire Radio AAHS network discontinued programming in January 1998.

Cumulus era
On January 21, 1998, the FCC assigned this station the "WDLT" call sign. Cumulus Media agreed to purchase WDLT from April Broadcasting, Inc., in November 1999. After a legal challenge to the sale was dismissed, the FCC approved the sale on November 30, 1999, and the transaction was formally consummated the same day.

Nine years later, the station was briefly assigned the call letters "WWFF" on September 21, 2007, before switching to the current "WXQW" on December 31, 2007.  This WXQW call sign was most recently assigned to a sister station (now WHRP, 94.1 FM) in the Huntsville, Alabama, market.

On October 12, 2015, WXQW changed its format from urban gospel (simulcasting WGOK 900 AM in Mobile) to conservative talk.

On January 20, 2016 WXQW was granted an FCC construction permit to decrease the night power to 180 watts. On January 4, 2017 WXQW filed an application for a construction permit to decrease night power to 19 watts. The application was accepted for filing on January 20, 2017.

References

External links
WXQW official website

XQW
News and talk radio stations in the United States
Radio stations established in 1964
Mass media in Baldwin County, Alabama
1964 establishments in Alabama
Cumulus Media radio stations